Naquin is a surname. Notable people with the surname include:

Kevin Naquin, American accordionist
Oliver F. Naquin (1904–1989), United States Navy admiral
Tyler Naquin (born 1991), American baseball player

Surnames of French origin